Langhagen is a village and a former municipality in the Rostock district, in Mecklenburg-Vorpommern, Germany. Since 25 May 2014, it is part of the municipality Lalendorf.

References

Former municipalities in Mecklenburg-Western Pomerania